The Battle of Blackstock's Farm, an encounter of the American Revolutionary War, took place in what today is Union County, South Carolina, a few miles from Cross Anchor, on November 20, 1780.

Background
After the defeat of Major Patrick Ferguson and the destruction or capture of his entire military force of 900 men at the Battle of Kings Mountain the previous month, the sparsely settled Carolina Backcountry had come increasingly under the control of the Patriots. Lieutenant General Charles Cornwallis, British commander in the Southern theater, ordered his subordinate Lieutenant Colonel Banastre Tarleton to abandon his chase of the guerrilla commander Brigadier General Francis Marion and instead disrupt the activities of Patriot militia Brigadier General Thomas Sumter, thereby returning confidence to Backcountry Tories. Meanwhile, Sumter had been gathering partisan volunteers and now had a thousand men under his command.

Preliminaries
On November 18, Tarleton's British Legion dragoons and the mounted infantry of the 63d Regiment were bathing and watering their horses on the Broad River when some of Sumter's raiders fired at them from the opposite bank.  The British brought up a 3-pounder "grasshopper" field gun and easily scattered the partisans. But Tarleton "did not submit easily to insults." Putting his men across the river in flat boats that night, he pressed Sumter hard the next day. Fortunately for Sumter, a deserter from the 63d Regiment revealed Tarleton's plans and location.

Although Sumter now had a thousand Backcountry militiamen, Tarleton had more than five hundred regulars under his command, including three hundred British regulars. And Tarleton had never yet been defeated. Sumter and his colonels decided the best course was to find a strong defensive position and wait for Tarleton to attack them. Colonel Thomas Brandon, who knew the area, suggested the nearby farm of William Blackstock, a homestead on the hills above the Tyger River.  The land had been cleared, providing fields of fire and room for maneuver, and the outbuildings—solid log structures—were not chinked and thus provided "narrow but convenient openings for men firing from behind cover."

Battle
Sumter placed Colonel Henry Hampton and his South Carolina riflemen in the farm outbuildings.  Some units he stationed behind stout fences and others he screened in the surrounding woods. Tarleton came up late in the fall afternoon and chose to make a frontal attack against a numerically superior force, not waiting for his infantry and artillery to catch up. At first he was successful.  The Patriot militia fired at too great a distance, and before they could reload Major John Money, commanding the 63d Regiment, hit them with the bayonet. Nevertheless, in doing so, the 63d advanced too close to the farm buildings and came under fire from Hampton's men inside, as usual aiming "at the epaulets and stripes." Money and two of his lieutenants were killed, and according to an officer of Fraser's Highlanders, a third of the privates as well. Meanwhile, other partisans worked their way around their right flank and attacked Tarleton's dragoons who were in their saddles but only watching the action.

Realizing that the battle was going against him, Tarleton desperately ordered an uphill cavalry charge against riflemen firing from cover. As Henry Lumpkin has written, "caution never was Tarleton's outstanding virtue." So many dragoons were knocked from their horses that "the road to the ford was blocked by the bodies of men and fallen chargers, the wounded, still targets, struggling back over their stricken comrades and kicking, screaming horses." Still, the British forces fell back in good order.

When Sumter, as "reckless as Tarleton", moved into position to watch the British withdrawal, members of the 63d fired a volley at him and his officers. Sumter was severely wounded and had to relinquish command to his most senior colonel, John Twiggs.

Tarleton retreated two miles to await his reinforcements for another attack the next morning. But Twiggs left camp fires burning and disappeared into the night. The next morning Tarleton's troops buried the dead of both sides, vastly disproportionate. Tarleton claimed that 51 of his men were killed or wounded.  A contemporary American account claimed higher numbers for the British casualties: 92 killed and 75-100 wounded. American casualties were 3 killed, 4 wounded, and 50 captured.

Aftermath
Tarleton lied in his battle report to Cornwallis that he had broken and dispersed the Americans. Of course, he made much of Sumter's wounding. He even told Cornwallis that three of his soldiers had "promised to fix Sumter immediately," for which he had promised them fifty guineas apiece.

In fact, Tarleton, one of the most hated and feared commanders in the backcountry, had been beaten for the first time, and his British regulars had been bested by militia — although from behind cover and not in the open field.  Even the wounding of the prickly Sumter proved to be an advantage to the Patriots because it allowed George Washington to appoint Nathanael Greene, a better strategist, to command the Southern department.

The Battle of Blackstock's Historic Site was added to the National Register of Historic Places in 1974.

References

Conflicts in 1780
Battles involving the United States
Battles involving Great Britain
Blackstock's Farm
Blackstock's Farm
Union County, South Carolina
1780 in South Carolina
American Revolution on the National Register of Historic Places